Krishnapur is a village in Jaunpur district of Uttar Pradesh, India. This village falls in the Badlapur tehesil of Jaunpur. Krishnapur is situated on the right hand side bank of river Gomati.

The primary entry point of Krishnapur village is at latitude 25.960668479926042, longitude 82.52148628234863. This village has views of the Gomati river and a Shiva temple.

Villages in Jaunpur district